Khutzeeymateen Provincial Park, also known as Khutzeymateen/K'tzim-A-Deen Grizzly Sanctuary, is a Class A provincial park located in the North Coast region of British Columbia, Canada. The park, within the purview of BC Parks, was established on August 15, 1994, to protect critical habitat for the region's grizzly bear population and the largest contiguous stand of old-growth Sitka spruce in the world. It was officially opened by Prince Philip, Duke of Edinburgh, on August 17, 1994.

Geography
It borders Ksi X'anmaas Conservancy to the north, Khutzeymateen Inlet Conservancy to the west, and, to the south, Khyex Conservancy, covering the Khyex River watershed. It is the first undisturbed estuary of its size to be protected along the north coast of BC.

History
The area that is now Khutzeymateen Provincial Park had been designated for logging when, in 1982, wildlife biologist and conservationist Wayne McCrory received an anonymous tip about a "unique valley" on the northwest coast. McCrory visited the inlet in October of that year, accompanied by bear researchers Stephen herrero and Ralph Archibald. "Overwhelmed" by what they saw, the team decided to campaign to protect it. A 300 km (185 mi) hunting ban was established around the inlet and the provincial Crown commissioned a study into ways of logging without harming grizzlies.

The preserve was created at the urging, and with the assistance, of Prince Philip, Duke of Edinburgh, the husband and consort of Elizabeth II, Queen of Canada. Reserchers worked with Philip, who was also President of the World Wildlife Fund, and the Lax-kw'alaams First Nation to secure its protection. The Prince, with 13 Tsimshian hereditary chiefs, opened the Khutzeeymateen Provincial Park on August 17, 1994, two days after it was established by order-in-council of the Queen's representative, Lieutenant Governor of British Columbia David Lam, on the advice of his Prime Minister, Mike Harcourt.

The Khutzeymateen Inlet Conservancy was established in 2008 with the aim of enhancing and ensuring the protection of important grizzly bear intertidal and foreshore habitats throughout the inlet, as well as protecting and maintaining biological diversity and natural environments; preserving social, ceremonial, and cultural uses of First Nations (Coast Tsimshian depend on this area); maintaining recreational values; and ensuring that development or use of natural resources occurs in a sustainable manner.

The park is the first area in Canada created specifically to protect grizzly bears and their habitat. Though this prevented hundreds of grizzly deaths in British Columbia each year, dozens are still killed as a result of poaching, vehicle collisions, and government-sanctioned animal control.

Activities
All visitors entering the sanctuary by boat are required to check-in at the K'tzim-a-deen Ranger Station, located in the inlet. Due to the ecological importance of the park, activities are limited to guided tours of the river estuary and a limited amount of controlled wildlife viewing from the inlet; shore access is forbidden. Land use is strictly prohibited.

References

External links
  Blue Book of Boats: Cruising Destination - Khutzeymateen Grizzly Bear Sanctuary

Provincial parks of British Columbia
North Coast of British Columbia
Wildlife sanctuaries of Canada
Grizzly bears
1994 establishments in British Columbia
Protected areas established in 1994